Who's That Girl? may refer to:

Film and television
 Who's That Girl (1987 film), an American film starring Madonna
 Who's That Girl, a Philippine film of 2011
 "Who's That Girl?", an episode of Wow! Wow! Wubbzy!

Music
 Who's That Girl World Tour, a tour by Madonna
 Ciao Italia: Live from Italy, a DVD of the tour by Madonna

Albums
 Who's That Girl (soundtrack), from the 1987 film
 Who's That Girl?, by Anahí de Cárdenas, 2013

Songs
 "Who's That Girl?" (Eurythmics song), 1983
 "Who's That Girl?" (Eve song), 2001
 "Who's That Girl" (Guy Sebastian song), 2010
 "Who's That Girl" (Madonna song), 1987
 "Who's That Girl" (Robyn song), 2005
 "Who's That Girl" (Stephanie Bentley song), 1996
 "Who's That Girl (She's Got It)", by A Flock of Seagulls, 1985
 "Who Dat Girl", by Flo Rida and Akon, 2010
 "Who's That Girl?", by Hilary Duff from Hilary Duff, 2004
 "Who's That Girl", by Lasgo from Far Away, 2005

Other uses
 Who's That Girl?, a 2009 novel by Alexandra Potter
 Who's That Girl?, a toy from MGA Entertainment

See also
 That Girl (disambiguation)